Saundra Meyer was a Democratic member of the Wyoming House of Representatives, representing the 49th district between 2007 and 2008. She previously served from 2001 through 2004.

Meyer also represented the 15th district in the Wyoming Senate between 2009 and 2011.

References

External links
Wyoming State Legislature - Representative Saundra Meyer official WY Senate website
Project Vote Smart - Representative Saundra Meyer (WY) profile
Follow the Money - Saundra Meyer
2006 2004 2002 2000 campaign contributions

Democratic Party members of the Wyoming House of Representatives
Year of birth missing (living people)
University of Wyoming alumni
University of Utah alumni
Living people
Women state legislators in Wyoming
Politicians from Lansing, Michigan
Speech and language pathologists
People from Evanston, Wyoming
21st-century American women